There are over 300 protected areas in Malta which have a wide range of national and international protection statuses.

References 

Protected areas of Malta
Nature conservation in Malta
Environment of Malta
Malta